Who Is This That I Love? is a 1950 West German musical comedy film directed by Géza von Bolváry and starring Jester Naefe, Adrian Hoven, and Iván Petrovich. It was shot at the Wiesbaden and Bavaria Studios and on location around Lake Starnberg. The film's sets were designed by the art directors Fritz Lück and Hans Sohnle.

Cast

References

Bibliography

External links 
 

1950 films
1950 musical comedy films
German musical comedy films
West German films
1950s German-language films
Films directed by Géza von Bolváry
German black-and-white films
1950s German films
Films shot at Bavaria Studios
Films shot in Bavaria